John Clark (February 1, 1761 – August 14, 1821) was an American farmer and politician from Blackbird Hundred in New Castle County, Delaware, near Smyrna. He was a member of the Federalist Party, who served in the Delaware General Assembly and as Governor of Delaware.

Early life and family
Clark was born at "New Bristol" in what is now Blackbird Hundred, New Castle County, just north of Smyrna, Delaware, son of William Clark. In 1784 he married Sarah Cook Corbit, daughter of Governor John Cook, and had a least one child, Mary. They lived at Clearfield Farm in what is now Blackbird Hundred in a house since used as an administrative office for the correctional facility located there. He was a member of the Presbyterian Church.

Political career
Clark was unusual politically in that he was a Federalist and a Presbyterian from New Castle County. The more typical Federalist was an Episcopalian or Methodist and from Kent or Sussex County. The more typical Democratic-Republican was a Presbyterian from New Castle County. Nevertheless, in 1816 he defeated the Federalist candidate, Manaen Bull of Laurel in Sussex County and served as Governor of Delaware from January 21, 1817 until January 18, 1820.

As governor he was one of a succession advocating improvements in public education. Carol Hoffecker in Democracy in Delaware relates how he "argued that Delaware had a special need to educate its people because the state lacked vacant land for an expanding population. Therefore, he said 'much reliance must be placed on the mental talents of our citizens for the support of our power and importance in the Union.'"  The General Assembly responded by appropriating a laughable $1,000 to each county for this purpose.

Furthermore, Delaware was stagnating. Medieval sounding punishments, like nailing ears to a pillory post, continued to be meted out in the penal system. The soil was increasingly exhausted and, due to the resulting out migration, Delaware's population in 1820 was roughly the same as in 1810. An immediate, and permanent, consequence was that it lost its second seat in the U.S. House of Representatives.

Death and legacy
Clark died at Smyrna and is buried in the Duck Creek Presbyterian Churchyard, now Holy Hill Cemetery, located south of Smyrna on Lake Como.

Almanac
Elections were held the first Tuesday in October. Members of the Delaware General Assembly took office in the first Tuesday of January. State representatives had a term of one year. The governor takes office the third Tuesday in January, and had a three-year term.

Notes

References

External links
Biographical Directory of the Governors of the United States
Delaware’s Governors

The Political Graveyard

1761 births
1821 deaths
American Presbyterians
People from New Castle County, Delaware
Delaware Federalists
Members of the Delaware House of Representatives
Governors of Delaware
Burials in Kent County, Delaware
Federalist Party state governors of the United States
People of colonial Delaware